Ulmus × mesocarpa M. Kim & S. Lee is a natural hybrid elm which is a cross of Ulmus macrocarpa with Japanese elm Ulmus davidiana var. japonica discovered on Seoraksan (Mount Sorak) near the city of Sokcho on the eastern coast of South Korea. The tree is endemic to the provinces of Gangwon-do, Injegun, Bukmyeon, Yongdaeri, and Baekdamsa.

Description
A small tree < 5 m high, typically intermediate between its parents, the generally obovate leaves 7–8 cm long, asymmetric at the base, with apices acuminate to caudate and an average of 31 teeth. The petioles are 6–8 mm long. The obovate samarae are < 20 mm long by 16 mm wide.

Pests and diseases
Not known.

Cultivation
Now in cultivation in the US and UK.

Synonymy
Ulmus davidiana var. japonica f. suberosa Nakai

Accessions
North America
Morton Arboretum, Lisle, Illinois, US. Acc. details not known.
Europe
Grange Farm Arboretum, Sutton St James, Lincolnshire, UK. Juvenile trees (2015) from cuttings ex. Morton Arboretum on U. glabra rootstocks. Acc. no. 1101.

Nurseries
Europe
Pan-global Plants , Frampton on Severn, Gloucestershire, UK.

References

Plant nothospecies
Flora of Korea
Ulmus articles missing images
mesocarpa
Ulmus hybrids